Deuteronomy 22 is the twenty-second chapter of the Book of Deuteronomy in the Hebrew Bible or the Old Testament of the Christian Bible.  The book is one of the Books of the Torah. This chapter contains regulations concerning theft of property, protection of life, manners, and violence in sexual relations.

Text
The original text of this chapter is written in the Hebrew language. This chapter is divided into 30 verses in English Bibles, but 29 verses in the Masoretic Text with the verse 30 in English Bibles numbered as 23:1.

Textual witnesses

Some early manuscripts containing the text of this chapter in Hebrew are of the Masoretic Text tradition, which includes the Aleppo Codex (10th century) and Codex Leningradensis (1008). Some fragments containing parts of this chapter were found among the Dead Sea Scrolls, including: 4Q36 (4QDeut; 100–75 BCE) with extant verses 1–9; 4Q45 (4QpaleoDeut; 100–25 BCE) with extant verses 3–6; and 4Q33 (4QDeut; 75–50 BCE) with extant verses 12–19.

There is also a translation into Koine Greek known as the Septuagint, made in the last few centuries BC. Extant ancient manuscripts of the Septuagint version include Codex Vaticanus (B; B; 4th century), and Codex Alexandrinus (A; A; 5th century).

Fairness and co-operation (22:1–4)
This part of the law distinguishes 'lost property' from 'theft', forbids  'ignoring (Hebrew: hit'allem) obvious cases for mutual help', with the aim to overcome 'indifference and irresponsibility'  (cf. ).

Ordinances protecting life and manners (22:5–12)

Verse 12
You shall make yourself tassels on the four corners of your garment with which you cover yourself.

Hebrew Bible

The tassels or fringes worn in antiquity by Israelites and today by observant Jews and Samaritans are called Tzitzit, to be attached to the four corners of the tallit gadol, (prayer shawl) usually referred to simply as a tallit or tallis; and tallit katan (everyday undergarment). The Talmud equates observance of tzitzit with that of all the mitzvot.

Family and sex laws (22:13-30)
A portion of the more elaborate collection of sex laws, this part looks into the 'dishonesty and violence in the sexual relations'.
 
 deals with situations in which a woman is accused by her husband of having been a non-virginal bride.  No witnesses or positive evidence of wrongdoing are required for her to be stoned to death as a consequence of this; rather, it is up to her parents to prove that she was a virgin by presenting the tokens of her virginity.

 specifically forbids a son to marry any of his father's former wives.

See also
 Marry-your-rapist law
 Rape in the Bible

References

Sources

External links

Jewish
 Deuteronomy 22 Hebrew with Parallel English

Christian
 Deuteronomy 22 English Translation with Parallel Latin Vulgate

22